Aquinas High School was a grades 9-12 parochial high school located in the Detroit suburb of Southgate.

History
Built under the joint effort of three local church parishes, St. Aloysius in Romulus, MI, St. Pius X in Southgate and Christ the Good Shepherd in Lincoln Park, classes for the first incoming freshman class began in 1966 at St. Pius X elementary school in Southgate while the high school building was nearing completion.  The first senior class graduated in 1970.

Class sizes averaged around 300 students in the 1970s, and 200 students throughout the 1980s, with a full curriculum.  However, various departments began phasing out about this time, beginning with the marching band program.  The school eventually closed in 2001 due to declining enrollment (only 81 students comprised the four grade levels combined), and reduced funding from the Archdiocese of Detroit.  Upon closure, remaining students were sent to other catholic high schools in the area, primarily Mount Carmel High School in Wyandotte, MI, Cabrini High School in Allen Park, MI, and Gabriel Richard Catholic High School in Riverview, MI.

The Aquinas Auditorium was also host to many up and coming rock acts of the early 70's including Alice Cooper as Aquinas was one of the few venues that would book such acts at the time.

Current
The building currently houses a few organizations, including The Guidance Center, which offers many free programs based out of the Aquinas Building including a Head Start program, which is a pre-school for low-income families.

Alumni
Among its graduates through the years were Paul Assenmacher, a left-handed baseball pitcher for several MLB clubs in the 1980s and 1990s that included World Series appearances, Kevin Nash former World Championship Wrestling and World Wrestling Entertainment superstar,  Mike Jolly, and James R. Downing, MD, president and CEO of St. Jude Children's Research Hospital.

References

Educational institutions established in 1966
Educational institutions disestablished in 2001
Defunct schools in Michigan
Madonna University
1966 establishments in Michigan
Defunct Catholic secondary schools in Michigan